Jacqueline Desiree Van Ovost (born September 29, 1965) is a United States Air Force general who has served as the 14th commander of the United States Transportation Command since October 15, 2021. She was nominated to that post by President Biden on March 5, 2021. Van Ovost had previously served as the commander of the Air Mobility Command from August 2020 to October 2021. In early 2021, she was the only active-duty female four-star general officer in the United States.

Education
Van Ovost received a Bachelor of Science in Aeronautical Engineering from the United States Air Force Academy in 1988. Immediately commissioning into the US Air Force, she attended U.S. Air Force Test Pilot School and graduated in 1994. Van Ovost holds master's degrees in mechanical engineering, military arts and sciences, and strategic studies from California State University, Fresno (1996), Air Command and Staff College (1999), and Air War College (2004), respectively.

Military career

Early career
Van Ovost was commissioned upon graduation from the United States Air Force Academy in 1988. She is a graduate of the U.S. Air Force Test Pilot School and is a command pilot with more than 4,200 hours in more than 30 aircraft, including the C-32A, C-17A, C-141B, and KC-135R. Van Ovost's notable military assignments include Vice Commander of the United States Air Force Expeditionary Center (2012-13), Deputy Director for Politico-Military Affairs (Europe, NATO, Russia) in the Strategic Plans and Policy Directorate (J5) of the Joint Staff (2013-15), Vice Director for the Joint Staff (2015-17), Director of Staff at Headquarters Air Force (2017-2020), and Deputy Commander of Air Mobility Command (April 2020-August 2020).

Air Mobility Command
On July 20, 2020, the Senate confirmed Van Ovost as commander of Air Mobility Command (AMC), a major command (MAJCOM) of the Air Force; Van Ovost also gained her fourth-star. She replaced retiring AMC commander Gen. Maryanne Miller, under whom she served as AMC's deputy commander, on August 20, 2020. Van Ovost served as AMC Commander until she relinquished command on October 5, 2021. In preparation for her expected confirmation as TRANSCOM head, President Biden nominated United States Indo-Pacific Command (INDOPACOM) deputy commander Lt. Gen. Michael Minihan to replace Van Ovost as AMC commander.

Transportation Command nomination
On March 6, 2021, Defense Secretary Lloyd Austin announced that President Biden had nominated Van Ovost to become commander of United States Transportation Command (TRANSCOM). Her nomination was sent to the Senate on March 5, 2021. Her nomination was originally recommended by then-Defense Secretary Mark Esper and General Mark Milley, but Esper later delayed it until after the 2020 United States presidential election due to his concerns of the Trump administration's possible reaction against nominating women to such high leadership positions. Van Ovost's nomination hearings to head TRANSCOM were held before the Senate Armed Services Committee on September 23, 2021. She was confirmed by the U.S. Senate by unanimous consent on October 1, 2021 and assumed command on October 15, 2021, becoming the second woman to lead a unified combatant command after General Lori Robinson.

Awards and decorations

Effective dates of promotion

References

External link

|-

1965 births
United States Air Force personnel of the Gulf War
United States Air Force personnel of the War in Afghanistan (2001–2021)
Living people
Recipients of the Air Force Distinguished Service Medal
Recipients of the Defense Superior Service Medal
Recipients of the Legion of Merit
United States Air Force Academy alumni
United States Air Force generals